Papular eruption of blacks is a cutaneous condition characterized clinically by small, pruritic papules and histologically by a mononuclear cell-eosinophil perivascular infiltrate.

See also 
 Pachydermatous eosinophilic dermatitis
 List of cutaneous conditions

References 

Eosinophilic cutaneous conditions